KBOA-FM (105.5 FM, "Magic 105") is a radio station broadcasting a hot adult contemporary music format. Licensed to Piggott, Arkansas, United States, the station is currently owned by Pollack Broadcasting Co. and features programming from Westwood One.

History
The station was assigned the call sign KTEI on 1983-01-25. On 1995-04-21, the station changed its call sign to the current KBOA-FM.

References

External links

BOA-FM
Hot adult contemporary radio stations in the United States